"Beautiful Faces" is a song by English singer, songwriter, and musician Declan McKenna. It was released as the lead single from his second studio album, Zeros, on 29 January 2020. The song was written by Declan McKenna and Max Marlow.

Live performances
On 5 April 2020, Declan McKenna performed the song live on Sunday Brunch. He performed the song from his home, saying that the COVID-19 pandemic made it impossible for his band to join him: "Unfortunately because of social distancing I can't have my band here with me today so I've got these guys in to help." In the background, four more McKennas were sat around the room, taking on the roles of his backing band.

Background
Speaking about the song, McKenna said, "I wanted it to be a big song...Scary big. It very much relates to now, but I wanted to reimagine social media in this future-sphere where it has become even more immersive so that we cannot see where it ends and we begin."

Music video
A music video to accompany the release of "Beautiful Faces" was released to YouTube on 29 January 2020.

Track listing

Personnel
Credits adapted from Tidal.
 Jay Joyce – producer
 Declan McKenna – composer, lyricist, associated performer, guitar, vocal
 Max Marlow – composer, lyricist
 Court Blankenship – assistant engineer
 Jimmy Mansfield – assistant engineer
 Gabrielle King – background vocal, drums
 Isabel Torres – background vocal, guitar
 Nathaniel Cox – background vocal, bass, synthesizer
 Jason Hall – engineer
 Matt Wolach – engineer
 Michael Freeman – engineer
 Matt Colton – mastering engineer
 Mark 'Spike' Stent – mixing engineer

Charts

Release history

References

2020 songs
2020 singles
Declan McKenna songs
Song recordings produced by Jay Joyce